The Musée du Panthéon National Haïtien (MUPANAH) is a museum featuring the heroes of the independence of Haiti, the Haitian history and culture.

History
The National Pantheon Museum in Port-Au-Prince,Haiti was opened in 1983. This cultural center is to perpetuate and disseminate the memory of "Fathers of the Nation".

One of its main missions is to participate in heritage conservation and prevent dissemination of national culture while teaching tourists about the Haitian culture. The MUPANAH is an institution whose function is the conservation, protection and enhancement of historical and cultural heritage.

2010 earthquake 
Following the earthquake in Haiti in 2010, the museum building was only slightly damaged due in part to its semi-buried construction, making it less prone to destruction.

Collections
The museum traces Taínos, Spanish, and a section dedicated to the heroes of independence, including the silver gun with which Henri Christophe committed suicide, and the bell used to announce Haitian independence. It also contains slavery chains, torture instruments, sculptures, and temporary exhibitions of paintings. The museum also contains the anchor of the Caravel of Christopher Columbus, the Santa Maria measuring 4 meters high.

See also 

 National Museum of Art
 National Museum of Haiti

References

Museums established in 1983
Museums in Haiti
1983 establishments in Haiti